Andrew Keith Leaf (born 18 January 1962) is an English former professional footballer who played as a defender in the Football League for York City, and in non-League football for Huby & Magnet.

References

1962 births
Living people
Footballers from York
English footballers
Association football defenders
York City F.C. players
English Football League players